Major General George Gordon Meade may refer to

 Equestrian statue of George Meade (Philadelphia)
 George Gordon Meade Memorial